Tenomerga is a genus of beetles in the family Cupedidae. This genus has about 17 extant species, which are native to the eastern Palearctic, Nearctic and Oriental regions.

Species
These 14 species belong to the genus Tenomerga:

 Tenomerga anguliscutis (Kolbe, 1886) i c g
 Tenomerga cinerea (Say, 1831) i c g b
 Tenomerga favella Neboiss, 1984 i c g
 Tenomerga gaolingziensis Ge and Yang, 2004 i c g
 Tenomerga japonica (Tamanuki, 1928) i c g
 Tenomerga kapnodes Neboiss, 1984 i c g
 Tenomerga kurosawai Miyatake, 1986 i c g
 Tenomerga leucophaea (Newman, 1839) i c g
 Tenomerga moultonii (Gestro, 1910) i c g
 Tenomerga mucida (Chevrolat, 1844) i c g
 Tenomerga sibyllae (Klapperich, 1950) i c g
 Tenomerga tianmuensis Ge and Yang, 2004 i c g
 Tenomerga trabecula Neboiss, 1984 i c g
 Tenomerga yamato Miyatake, 1985 i c g

Data sources: i = ITIS, c = Catalogue of Life, g = GBIF, b = Bugguide.net

References

External links

 
 

Archostemata genera
Cupedidae